Achriabhach is a hamlet in Glen Nevis, Lochaber, Highland, Scotland.

Achriabhach is adjacent to the Ben Nevis Site of Special Scientific Interest as designated by Scottish Natural Heritage.

References

Populated places in Lochaber